Badarpur may refer to:

 Badarpur, Delhi, India
 Badarpur, Gujarat, India
 Badarpur, Assam, India
 Badarpur railway station
 Badarpur Railway Town, Assam
 Badarpur, Bangladesh